Alikuh (also Romanized as Ālīkūh and ‘Ālī Kūh; also known as Ālkūh) is a village in Poshtkuh Rural District of the Central District of Ardal County, Chaharmahal and Bakhtiari province, Iran. At the 2006 census, its population was 2,382 in 473 households. The following census in 2011 counted 2,714 people in 716 households. The latest census in 2016 showed a population of 2,206 people in 628 households; it was the largest village in its rural district.

References 

Ardal County

Populated places in Chaharmahal and Bakhtiari Province

Populated places in Ardal County